Homegrown is a 1998 American dark comedy-drama thriller film directed by Stephen Gyllenhaal and starring Billy Bob Thornton, John Lithgow and Hank Azaria.

Plot
Small-fry marijuana harvesters in Northern California try to keep the business running, negotiating the biggest sale ever and keeping a secret. But when silent partners, the Mafia, the police, and other meddlers crash the party, they begin to realize they are in over their heads.

Cast
John Lithgow  as Malcolm / Robert Stockman
Jon Tenney  as Helicopter Pilot
Ryan Phillippe  as Harlan Dykstra
Hank Azaria  as Carter
Billy Bob Thornton as Jack Marsden
Kelly Lynch as Lucy
Jon Bon Jovi as Danny
Kleoka Renee Sands as 4-Year-Old Girl
Matt Ross  as Ben Hickson
Judge Reinhold  as Policeman
Leigh French  as Waitress
Christopher Dalton as Old Farmer
Jamie Lee Curtis  as Sierra Kahan
Ted Danson  as Gianni Saletzzo
Tiffany Paulsen  as Heather the Stockbreeder
Jeanette H. Wilson as White Haired Woman
Jake Gyllenhaal as Jake / Blue Kahan
Seamus McNally as Hippie Hank
Steve Carell as Party Extra with Funny Pants (uncredited)
Ramsay Midwood as Bill the Gas station guy

Soundtrack
The soundtrack was released on June 11, 2002 on Will Records.

Track list:

 "Smoke Two Joints" by Sublime [4:46] – (original version by The Toyes)
 "Book Of Rules" by The Heptones [3:51]
 "GBH" by Death In Vegas [5:13]
 "Pass The Dutchie" by Buck-O-Nine [2:59]
 "We Are Dumb" by Home Grown [1:55]
 "I Smell A Rat" by Sebadoh [1:36]
 "Stars" by Green Apple Quick Step [3:17]
 "Gone To Stay" by Elaine Summers [3:58]
 "Great Escape" by Chaser [4:44]
 "Sick And Beautiful" by Artificial Joy Club [4:24]
 "Electro Glide in Blue" by Apollo Four Forty [8:36]
 "Burn" by Lucky Me [4:10]
 "Hold on to Me" by Cowboy Junkies [3:21]

References

External links

1998 films
1998 comedy-drama films
1990s comedy thriller films
1990s thriller drama films
American buddy films
American comedy-drama films
American comedy thriller films
American thriller drama films
American films about cannabis
Films directed by Stephen Gyllenhaal
Films set in California
Lakeshore Entertainment films
TriStar Pictures films
Films scored by Trevor Rabin
1998 in cannabis
Stoner crime films
1990s English-language films
1990s American films